Cheng Kai-wen (using "" as his registration until 2010, born July 26, 1988) is a Taiwanese baseball pitcher for the CTBC Brothers of the Chinese Professional Baseball League (CPBL).

Career
He was signed to a one-year contract with the Hanshin Tigers. After playing with the Tigers through the 2012 season, Cheng signed with the Yokohama DeNA BayStars of Nippon Professional Baseball for the 2013 season. After the year, Cheng signed with the Chinatrust Brothers, whom he has played for from 2014 to 2020.

He was selected Chinese Taipei national baseball team at the 2008 Summer Olympics, 2009 World Baseball Classic and 2018 MLB Japan All-Star Series exhibition game against Japan

References

1988 births
Living people
Asian Games medalists in baseball
Asian Games silver medalists for Chinese Taipei
Baseball players at the 2014 Asian Games
Hanshin Tigers players
Medalists at the 2014 Asian Games
Nippon Professional Baseball pitchers
Olympic baseball players of Taiwan
Baseball players from Tainan
Taiwanese expatriate baseball players in Japan
Yokohama DeNA BayStars players